The Ar-17 UAV is a series of unmanned helicopters developed by Arc Aviation for industrial applications.

Ar-17 is now used in the agricultural, electrical and security fields, particularly in the Far East.

Specification 
Take-off Weight: 100 kg
Empty Weight: 65 kg
Payload: 30 kg
Tank Capacity: 8 liters
Rotor Diameter: 3240 mm
Dimensions: 2730 * 780 * 1040 mm
Max Speed: 120 km/hr
Max Flight Time: 1 hour (6 hours with external fuel tanks)
Service Ceiling: 2000 m
Engine: 2-Stroke
Fuel: Gasoline

Development
The early prototype of the Ar-17, with the code P1016, was developed in 2014 by the Arc Aviation R&D team.

References

Unmanned aerial vehicles of Japan
Agricultural robotics
Airborne military robots
Unmanned helicopters of China